The following elections occurred in the year 1945.

Africa

 1945 South-West African legislative election

Asia
 1945 Indian general election

Australia
 1945 Fremantle by-election

Europe
 1945 Albanian parliamentary election
 1945 Bulgarian parliamentary election
 1945 Danish Folketing election
 1945 Finnish parliamentary election
 1945 Hungarian parliamentary election
 1945 Irish presidential election
 1945 Luxembourgian legislative election
 1945 Norwegian parliamentary election
 1945 Norwegian local elections
 1945 Portuguese legislative election

Austria
 1945 Austrian legislative election
 elections ('Landtagswahl') in all States of Austria: 
 in Burgenland
 in Kärnten (Carinthia)
 in Niederösterreich (Lower Austria
 in Oberösterreich (Upper Austria)
 in Salzburg (Salzburg (state)
 in der Steiermark (Styria)
 in Tirol (Tyrol)
 in Vorarlberg (Vorarlberg) 
 in Vienna

France
 1945 French constitutional referendum
 1945 French legislative election

United Kingdom
 1945 Ashton-under-Lyne by-election
 1945 Caernarvon Boroughs by-election
 1945 Chelmsford by-election
 1945 Combined Scottish Universities by-election
 1945 United Kingdom general election
 List of MPs elected in the 1945 United Kingdom general election
 1945 Middlesbrough West by-election
 1945 Monmouth by-election
 1945 Motherwell by-election
 1945 Neath by-election
 1945 Newport by-election
 1945 Northern Ireland general election
 1945 Smethwick by-election
 1945 Tottenham North by-election

United Kingdom local
 1945 Manchester Council election

English local
 1945 Bermondsey Borough election
 1945 Southwark Borough election

North America
 1945 Panamanian Constitutional Assembly election
 1945 Panamanian presidential election

Canada
 1945 Canadian federal election
 1945 British Columbia general election
 1945 Edmonton municipal election
 1945 Manitoba general election
 1945 Nova Scotia general election
 1945 Ontario general election
 1945 Toronto municipal election

Oceania

Australia
 1945 Fremantle by-election

South America
 1945 Brazilian legislative election
 1945 Brazilian presidential election
 1945 Salvadoran presidential election

See also
 :Category:1945 elections

1945
Elections